Timothy Grant Metcalfe (born 12 March 1988) is an Australian-born, Los Angeles-based songwriter and record producer. He is best known for his work on Robbie Williams' platinum-selling album Take the Crown (2012), with writing partner Flynn Francis. Metcalfe wrote eight songs on the album, which has become an international hit. Take the Crown has sold over 1.5 million copies worldwide and has risen to No. 1 in seven countries, including the UK, Germany, and Ireland.

Career 
In June 2012, Metcalfe signed with Universal Music Publishing Group president Evan Lamberg as a songwriter and producer.

In 2014, Metcalfe co-wrote and produced six songs on Robbie Williams' album Under the Radar Volume 1. The opening song, "Bully", was released for free on 1 December to Williams' fans, presented by Café Royal, who promoted it on the same day in the brand's first television advert as part of the campaign "In the service of good taste".

Metcalfe worked with drum and bass producer Piers Baron on a band project, Maize. Maize have remixed songs for Gwen Stefani, Marina and the diamonds and Ms Mr. In 2016, Maize released I Like You. In 2017, he co-wrote and produced six songs on Robbie Williams' album Under the Radar Volume 2, including the lead single "Eyes on the Highway".  

On 25 February 2022, it was revealed that Metcalfe had teamed up with regular collaborators Robbie Williams and Flynn Francis to record the trance track "Sway", with Williams adopting new alias 'Lufthaus'.

References

Living people
1988 births
Australian songwriters
Australian record producers
Songwriters from California
Record producers from California